The Rich List is an Australian game show which is based on the format initially created for transmission in the United Kingdom created by 12 Yard called Who Dares Wins (not to be confused with the stunt and dare show of the same name). The game consists of two teams who name as many items relating to a topic as they can while competing against each other for a no-limit cash prize. For its first season, it was shown on Monday nights at 7:30 pm on the Seven Network but moved to Saturday nights in the same timeslot for the second season, before being put on hiatus and returning to its original season-one timeslot.

The show premiered in its regular Monday timeslot on 29 January 2007 at 7:30 pm and continued with a special episode on 30 January to give people a chance to watch the show who opted to watch Steve Irwin's last documentary Ocean's Deadliest which went up against The Rich List on Monday the 29th on the rival station, the Nine Network. The show is recorded at the Melbourne Central City Studios. This version follows the basic rules of other versions of the show.

The program is hosted by the Deal or No Deal host Andrew O'Keefe. The pilot episode was taped on 18 October 2006. The show began taping episodes for air on 11 December 2006.

The first series of The Rich List ended on 25 June 2007, after a season of steady consistent ratings of 1.1 to 1.3 million viewers. A second series began airing 24 May 2008, although just 721,000 viewers tuned into the season premiere episode, placing the Seven Network fourth out of five in its timeslot. After the second episode rated 715,000 viewers, the Seven Network initially pulled The Rich List from the schedule, but it returned from hiatus a few months later on 3 November 2008. The Rich List has been put back on hiatus from 14 January 2009; no new episodes have been produced since then.

The voice-over introducing the show is Marcus Irvine, notable for being the voice of past game show The Weakest Link.

Gameplay
The Gameplay is similar to the format used in the United States (although, despite the fact that an entire series was filmed with Eamonn Holmes as host, it has never been aired). It consists of two rounds. A best of three no money amount lists followed by "The Rich List" where a team can win $250,000 for completing each list with 15 answers. There is no limit to how many "Rich Lists" a team can partially or fully complete and therefore, teams are capable of winning an unlimited amount of money.

Best of three lists
Two teams of two players, one of which are the champions from the previous episode and the other are a new pair of challengers, are presented to the audience. The two teams, who have not met before the show, are placed in separate soundproof isolation booths, with audio that is turned on or off by the host. He announces the category for the list, such as "Wimbledon Men's Singles champions" or "Squares from a Monopoly board" then asks the challengers to place a bid on the number of items they must name to win the list. The host switches the audio on and off between the booths as the bidding continues. Note that if players do not feel they can bid higher than their opponents' bid, they can choose to bluff their bids (as the opponent side cannot hear the team's conversations) in an attempt to pressure the opponents to raise their bid further. The host turns both audios on when one team has challenged the other to fulfill the bid.

The challenged team must list in a row as many items as their bid in order to win the list. If the team makes one mistake along the way, the list is awarded to their opponents.

The first team to win two lists has won the best of three and goes on to play "The Rich List".

Tiebreaker
If each team wins one list apiece, a sudden death tiebreaker is played. The host gives the category, both booths are switched on, and the teams alternate their answers. In order to win the list and the best of three, one team must give an incorrect answer while the other team gives a correct answer. In case if both teams fail to name an item on the same turn, both teams get another chance to name another item. Should that fail, another tiebreaker list will be used to break the tie.

The Rich List
The winning team moves on to play "The Rich List" where Andrew gives the team a new category and the chance to supply up to 15 correct answers. Winnings increase after every third correct answer is given, according to the following table.

If a wrong answer is given at any time, the team loses all accumulated money they won from that "Rich List", but all winnings from previous "Rich Lists" that the team may have completed are safe. After every third answer, they can choose to stop playing, winning all the money accumulated from the current "Rich List" or play on, until the team lists all fifteen answers, therefore winning $250,000. Regardless of the outcome, the team then returns to the isolated soundproof booths to play the game again against a new pair of opponents. Only a loss when playing "The Best of three lists" can eliminate teams from the show.

Errors
Many lists in the show are known to have mistakes or inaccurate information in them. The list about countries adopting the euro contained a country called "Holland", which is in fact a region of the Netherlands. There have also been other mistakes in lists such as "Island Nations" where the list included nations that share the land territory of the island with other nation-states, and "Top 20 countries with the most land area".  A list of nation's common names beginning with B listed Bermuda, which is a British Overseas Territory, and Britain, which is the name of the island on which the United Kingdom, except Ireland, is situated. A list of countries beginning with A also accepted America, as it "is the way most Australians would say it", despite the country in question actually being called the United States of America. The term 'country' was replaced with Sovereign States to avoid such confusion or partial duplication.

Ratings
The show's premiere on 29 January placed fourth in daily ratings and second in its timeslot Ocean's Deadliest on Nine Network, which aired at the same time as The Rich List, attracted about 250,000 more. However, the show performed better in the next episode. Despite attracting less viewers than 1 vs. 100 in the first few weeks, the show attracted 40,000 more viewers on 5 March.

The show is usually in the top 20 most watched programs each week according to ratings measuring company OzTAM.

Today Tonight aired a feature article on the Rich List and interviewed two contestants, Bec and a guy who named at least 15 British Prime Ministers. They won $250,000 but couldn't get the money until the episode was actually shown.

List of episodes

Season 1 (2007)

Season 2 (2008–2009)

References

External links

 

2000s Australian game shows
Seven Network original programming
2007 Australian television series debuts
2009 Australian television series endings
English-language television shows
Television series by ITV Studios